Nothing Compares may refer to:

 Nothing Compares 2 U, 1985 song written and composed by Prince, 1990 version by Sinéad O'Connor 
 Nothing Compares (film), 2022 documentary film
 "Nothing Compares" (song), song by the Weeknd